

Models

Supported

Unsupported (32-bit CPU)

iPad Mini

Supported

Unsupported

iPad Air

Supported

Unsupported

iPad Pro

Supported

Comparison of models

See also 
 List of iOS, tvOS, and watchOS devices

References 

Apple Inc. lists
IOS
IPad
iPad